Ptah  (reconstructed ; ; ; Phoenician: 𐤐𐤕𐤇, romanized: ptḥ) is an ancient Egyptian deity, a creator god and patron deity of craftsmen and architects. In the triad of Memphis, he is the husband of Sekhmet and the father of Nefertem. He was also regarded as the father of the sage Imhotep.

Origin and symbolism

Ptah is an Egyptian creator god who  conceived the world and brought it into being through the creative power of speech. A hymn to Ptah dating to the Twenty-second Dynasty of Egypt says Ptah "crafted the world in the design of his heart," and the Shabaka Stone, from the Twenty-Fifth Dynasty, says Ptah "gave life to all the gods and their kas as well, through this heart and this tongue."

He bears many epithets that describe his role in ancient Egyptian religion and its importance in society at the time:

 Ptah the begetter of the first beginning
 Ptah lord of truth
 Ptah lord of eternity
 Ptah who listens to prayers
 Ptah master of ceremonies
 Ptah master of justice
 Ptah the God who made himself to be God
 Ptah the double being
 Ptah the beautiful face

Representations and hypostases
Like many deities of ancient Egypt he takes many forms, through one of his particular aspects or through syncretism of ancient deities of the Memphite region. Sometimes represented as a dwarf, naked and deformed, his popularity would continue to grow during the Late Period. Frequently associated with the god Bes, his worship then moved beyond the borders of Egypt and was exported throughout the Eastern Mediterranean. Through dissemination by the Phoenicians, we find figures of Ptah in Carthage.

Ptah is generally represented in the guise of a man with green skin, contained in a shroud sticking to the skin, wearing the divine beard, and holding a sceptre combining three powerful symbols of ancient Egyptian religion:
 The Was sceptre
 The sign of life, Ankh
 The Djed pillar
These three combined symbols indicate the three creative powers of the god: power (was), life (ankh) and stability (djed).

From the Old Kingdom, he quickly absorbs the appearance of Sokar and Tatenen, ancient deities of the Memphite region. His form of Sokar is found contained in its white shroud wearing the Atef crown, an attribute of Osiris. In this capacity, he represents the patron deity of the necropolis of Saqqara and other famous sites where the royal pyramids were built. Gradually he formed with Osiris a new deity called Ptah-Sokar-Osiris. Statuettes representing the human form, the half-human, half-hawk form, or simply the pure falcon form of the new deity began to be systematically placed in tombs to accompany and protect the dead on their journey to the West.

His Tatenen form is represented by a young and vigorous man wearing a crown with two tall plumes that surround the solar disk. He thus embodies the underground fire that rumbles and raises the earth. As such, he was particularly revered by metalworkers and blacksmiths, but he was equally feared because it was he who caused earthquakes and tremors of the earth's crust. In this form also, Ptah is the master of ceremonies for Heb Sed, a ceremony traditionally attesting to the first thirty years of a pharaoh's reign.

The god Ptah could correspond with the sun deities Re or Aten during the Amarna period, where he embodied the divine essence with which the sun god was fed to come into existence, that is to say to be born, according to the Memphite mythological/theological texts. In the holy of holies of his temple in Memphis, as well as in his great sacred boat, he drove in procession to regularly visit the region during major holidays. Ptah was also symbolized by two birds with human heads adorned with solar disks, symbols of the souls of the god Re: the Ba. The two Ba are identified as the twin gods Shu and Tefnut and are associated with the djed pillar of Memphis.

Finally, Ptah is embodied in the sacred bull, Apis. Frequently referred to as a herald of Re, the sacred animal is the link with the god Re from the New Kingdom. He even received worship in Memphis, probably at the heart of the great temple of Ptah, and upon the death of the animal, was buried with all the honours due to a living deity in the Serapeum of Saqqara.

Scholars have also associated Ptah with the Mandaean angel Ptahil outside of Egypt, due to their somewhat similar features and closely related names.

Development of the cult

The cult of the god Ptah quickly spread throughout Egypt. With the major royal projects of the Old Kingdom, the high priests of Ptah were particularly sought after and worked in concert with the vizier, filling the role of chief architects and master craftsmen, responsible for the decoration of the royal funerary complexes.

In the New Kingdom, the cult of the god would develop in different ways, especially in Memphis, his homeland, but also in Thebes, where the workers of the royal tombs honoured him as patron of craftsmen. For this reason, the oratory of Ptah who listens to prayers was built near the site of Deir el-Medina, the village where the workers and craftsmen were housed. At Memphis, the role of intercessor with humans was particularly visible in the appearance of the enclosure that protected the sanctuary of the god. Large ears were carved on the walls, symbolizing his role as god who listens to prayers.

With the Nineteenth Dynasty, his cult grew and he became one of the four great deities of the empire of Ramesses. He was worshipped at Pi-Ramesses as master of ceremonies and coronations.

With the Third Intermediate Period, Ptah returned to the centre of the monarchy where the coronation of the pharaoh was held again in his temple. The Ptolemies continued this tradition, and the high priests of Ptah were then increasingly associated with the royal family, with some even marrying princesses of royal blood, clearly indicating the prominent role they played in the Ptolemaic court.

Main places of worship

Gallery

Legacy
Memphis was believed to be under the protection of the god Ptah, the patron of craftsmen. Its great temple, Hut-ka-Ptah (meaning "Enclosure of the ka of Ptah"), was one of the most prominent structures in the city. This word entered Ancient Greek as Αἴγυπτος (Aiguptos), which entered Latin as Aegyptus, which developed into Middle French Egypte and was finally borrowed into English first as Egipte in Middle English and ultimately as Egypt. 

Ptah is one of the deities mentioned in Giuseppe Verdi's opera Aida. He is invoked in a chorus, "Possente Fthà" ("O Mighty Ptah"), in Act 1, scene 2; this chorus is reprised as "Immenso Fthà" ("Immense Ptah"), at the end of the opera as the protagonists Aida and Radamès die.

5011 Ptah is an asteroid named after the Egyptian god.

Ptah appears as a minor character in Rick Riordan's novel The Throne of Fire. While searching for a scroll in the catacombs beneath Bahariya, protagonist Sadie Kane discovers a statue of Ptah and attempts to summon him to help them without success. Later, Ptah suddenly arrives in the body of a date farmer, having merely been delayed in his arrival. Ptah sends an army of rats to destroy an army of mummies sent to attack them the same way as Ptah had once defeated an army of invaders by having a horde of rats eat their bowstrings and sandals in myth. Ptah gives the two some advice and opens a portal for them to reunite with Sadie's brother Carter before being forced to depart the farmer's body.

In popular culture

See also
Kothar-wa-Khasis
Ptahil in Mandaeism
Vishvakarma

Notes

References

Literature
 Allen, James P. Genesis in Egypt: The Philosophy of Ancient Egyptian Creation Accounts. New Haven, 1988. 
 Gunn, Battiscombe G. Instruction of Ptah-Hotep and the Instruction of Ke'Gemni: The Oldest Books in the World. 1998  Google books
 Rothöhler, Benedikt. Neue Gedanken zum Denkmal memphitischer Theologie. Heidelberg, 2006 www.ub.uni-heidelberg.de/archiv/7030
 Sandman Holmberg, Maj. The God Ptah. C. W. K. Gleerup, 1946.
 Thompson, Dorothy J. Memphis Under the Ptolemies, Second Edition. Princeton, 2012.
 Zivie, Alain-Pierre. Memphis et ses nécropoles au Nouvel Empire. Éditions du CNRS, 1988

External links

 
Creator gods
Crafts gods
Egyptian gods
Smithing gods
Fertility gods
Solar gods
Falcon deities